The 1994–95 NBA season was the 49th season for the Boston Celtics in the National Basketball Association. It was also the last season of play at the Boston Garden. After missing the playoffs the previous season, the Celtics had the ninth pick in the 1994 NBA draft, and selected Eric Montross from the University of North Carolina. Prior to the season, the Celtics signed free agent All-Star forward Dominique Wilkins (a controversial move late in Wilkins' career), signed free agents Pervis Ellison, second-year guard David Wesley and rookie guard Greg Minor, and acquired Blue Edwards and Derek Strong from the Milwaukee Bucks. The Celtics got off to a 7–6 start in November, but played below .500 for the remainder of the season, holding a 19–27 record at the All-Star break. At midseason, Edwards was traded back to his former team, the Utah Jazz in exchange for Jay Humphries. The Celtics won eight of their final twelve games finishing third in the Atlantic Division with a 35–47 record.

Wilkins averaged 17.8 points and 5.2 rebounds per game, while second-year star Dino Radja averaged 17.2 points, 8.7 rebounds and 1.3 blocks per game, and Dee Brown provided the team with 15.6 points and 1.4 steals per game. In addition, Sherman Douglas contributed 14.7 points and 6.9 assists per game, while Montross averaged 10.0 points and 7.3 rebounds per game, and was selected to the NBA All-Rookie Second Team. Off the bench, Rick Fox contributed 8.8 points per game, but only played 53 games due to ankle and foot injuries, while Xavier McDaniel provided with 8.6 points and 4.4 rebounds per game. Wesley contributed 7.4 points, 5.2 assists and 1.6 steals per game in only 51 games, starting in 36 of them due to a knee injury, while Ellison averaged 6.8 points and 5.6 rebounds per game, and Strong provided with 6.3 points and 5.4 rebounds per game.

Despite finishing six games under .500, the Celtics qualified for the playoffs as the #8 seed in the Eastern Conference. In the Eastern Conference First Round, the team suffered a 47-point margin in a Game 1 road loss to the #1 seed Orlando Magic, 124–77, but managed to defeat them in Game 2, 99–92 (seizing the "theoretical home court advantage" for the series). However, the Magic defeated the Celtics at Boston Garden in both Games 3 and 4 to close out the series. The Magic would go on to reach the NBA Finals for the first time, but would lose in four straight games to the 6th-seeded, and defending champion Houston Rockets.

Following the season, Wilkins and McDaniel both left to play in Greece, while Strong signed as a free agent with the Los Angeles Lakers, Humphries was released to free agency, and head coach Chris Ford was fired. General Manager M.L. Carr explained the firing as having to do with "diminishing returns".

Draft picks

Roster

Regular season

Season standings

Record vs. opponents

Game log

Regular season

|- align="center" bgcolor="#ffcccc"
| 3
| November 11, 19947:30p.m. EST
| Houston
| L 82–102
| Radja (31)
| Radja (11)
| Fox (6)
| Boston Garden14,890
| 0–3

|- align="center" bgcolor="#ccffcc"
| 23
| December 17, 19948:30p.m. EST
| @ Houston
| W 112–109
| Wilkins (43)
| Montross (12)
| Wesley (11)
| The Summit15,757
| 10–13

|- align="center"
|colspan="9" bgcolor="#bbcaff"|All-Star Break
|- style="background:#cfc;"
|- bgcolor="#bbffbb"

Playoffs

|- align="center" bgcolor="#ffcccc"
| 1
| April 28
| @ Orlando
| L 77–124
| Dee Brown (20)
| Dominique Wilkins (9)
| Sherman Douglas (6)
| Orlando Arena16,010
| 0–1
|- align="center" bgcolor="#ccffcc"
| 2
| April 30
| @ Orlando
| W 99–92
| Dominique Wilkins (24)
| Brown, Radja (8)
| Sherman Douglas (15)
| Orlando Arena16,010
| 1–1
|- align="center" bgcolor="#ffcccc"
| 3
| May 3
| Orlando
| L 77–82
| Brown, Wilkins (16)
| Pervis Ellison (10)
| Sherman Douglas (7)
| Boston Garden14,890
| 1–2
|- align="center" bgcolor="#ffcccc"
| 4
| May 5
| Orlando
| L 92–95
| Dominique Wilkins (22)
| Dominique Wilkins (18)
| Douglas, Brown (5)
| Boston Garden14,890
| 1–3
|-

Player statistics

Season

Playoffs

Awards

Transactions
The Celtics were involved in the following transactions during the 1994–95 season.

Trades

Free agents

Additions

Subtractions

Player Transactions Citation:

See also
 1994–95 NBA season

References

Boston Celtics seasons
Boston Celtics
Boston Celtics
Boston Celtics
Celtics
Celtics